Friendship Day (also known as International Friendship Day or Friend's Day) is a day in several countries for celebrating friendship. It was initially promoted by the greeting card industry; evidence from social networking sites shows a revival of interest in Friendship Day that may have grown with the spread of the internet, particularly in India, Bangladesh, and Malaysia. Mobile phones, digital communication, and social media have contributed to popularize the custom. Those who promote the day in South Asia attribute the tradition of dedicating a day in honour of friends to have originated in the United States in 1935.

History
Friendship Day was first proposed in Paraguay in 1958 by Joyce Hall. It was a holiday involving the celebration of friendships through a global holiday. The original date of celebration was 2 August, though it has since been moved to 7 August due to de-synchronisation in the United States.

To honor Friendship Day, in 1998, Nane Annan named Winnie the Pooh the world's Ambassador of Friendship at the United Nations. The event was co-sponsored by the U.N. Department of Public Information and Disney Enterprises, co-hosted by Kathy Lee Gifford.

During said meeting, the World Friendship Crusade was born. The World Friendship Crusade is a foundation that promotes friendship and fellowship among all human beings, regardless of race, color or religion. Since then, 30 July has been fervently celebrated as Friendship Day in Paraguay every year and has also been adopted by several other countries.

The World Friendship Crusade has lobbied the United Nations for several years to recognize 30 July as World Friendship Day; finally, in 2011, the General Assembly of the United Nations decided to designate 30 July as the International Day of Friendship and proceeded to invite all the Member States to observe the International Day of Friendship per the culture and customs of their local, national and regional communities, including through education and public awareness-raising activities.

Celebrations in February 
In Ecuador, Mexico, Venezuela, Finland, Estonia and the Dominican Republic, Friendship Day is celebrated on 14 February, as opposed to Valentine's Day.

Celebrations in April 
In South Africa, celebrations are on 16 April.

Celebrations in June 
In Ukraine, celebrations are on 9 June.

Celebrations in July 
In Ecuador and Venezuela, celebrations are on 14 July. In Pakistan, this event is celebrated on 19 July every year. In Bolivia, Friendship Day is celebrated on 23 July. In Nepal, Friendship Day is celebrated on 30 July.

In Paraguay, 29 July is used for giving gifts to close friends and family. Celebrations often take place in bars and nightclubs. The game of the Invisible Friend is considered a tradition, in which small sheets of paper with names are given to members of a group and each of them secretly selects on another, and on 30 July gives a present to the person whose name was written on the paper. This custom is practised in both schools and workplaces in Asunción and other Paraguayan cities.

Since 2009, Peru has celebrated "El dia del Amigo" on the first Saturday of July. The date was proposed by the beer brand Pilsen Callao. The objective was to recognize true friendship and differentiate it from love and the celebration of Valentine's Day.

In Argentina, Brazil, Spain and Uruguay, Friendship Day (or Friend's Day) is celebrated on 20 July. It is a reason for a friendly gathering and greeting both current and old friends.

It became a popular celebration thanks to Enrique Ernesto Febbraro, an Argentinian dentist and Rotarian who had the idea to commemorate International Friendship as an unifying gesture of friendship among nations, inspired by the day Neil Armstrong stepped on the Moon. He sent 1,000 letters to contacts from the Rotary Club around the world while the Apollo 11 was still in space and received 700 responses that kickstarted the celebration.

In Argentina, Friend's Day has turned into a very popular mass phenomenon. For instance, in 2005, the amount of well-wishing messages and calls led to a breakdown of the mobile phone network in the cities of Buenos Aires, Mendoza, Córdoba and Rosario, comparable to the one experienced in 2004 on Christmas and New Year's Day. Seats in most restaurants, bars, and other establishments are often completely booked a week before the celebration.

Celebrations in August

In India Friendship Day is celebrated on the first Sunday in the month of August. The celebration got huge widespread among teenagers and youngsters in the early 1990s with the influence of Bollywood movies.
Friends tie a Friendship band (a ribbon band) to each other as a gesture of celebrating their friendship. 
College students generally wear a white t-shirt on that day and they write each other’s names or friendship quotes on it.

Bibliography

  [UN Resolution A/65/L.72]

References

External links
International Day of Friendship 30 July  

Friendship
Types of secular holidays
February observances
April observances
June observances
July observances
August observances
Sunday observances
Holidays and observances by scheduling (nth weekday of the month)